The Glasflügel 201 Standard Libelle (German: "Dragonfly") is an early composite Standard Class single-seat sailplane produced by Glasflügel from 1967.

Development
The 201 was a Standard Class sailplane that was a successor to the H-301 Libelle Open Class glider. It was similar to the H-301, with modifications to meet the Standard Class requirements. The prototype made its first flight in October 1967, with a total of 601 being built. The type soon made its mark in contest flying; one flown by Per-Axel Persson of Sweden, winner of the 1948 World Championships, came second in the Standard Class at the 1968 World Championships at Leszno in Poland.

The Libelle and Standard Libelle were very popular and influential designs. Their very light wings and extremely easy rigging set a new benchmark. Their handling is generally good.

The 201 was superseded by the Glasflügel 206 Hornet.

Design
The Standard Libelle (201) is of similar glassfibre construction to the H-301 Libelle. The changes required consisted of removing the flaps and tail braking parachute, fitting a fixed, instead of retractable, monowheel and raising the height of the canopy. A new Wortmann wing section was featured and terminal velocity dive brakes were fitted.

With a change in the Standard Class rules, the 201B of 1969 introduced a retractable gear and a water ballast system as an option, with one 25-litre bag per wing located before the spar, with valve and dumping orifice on the fuselage underside. Other improvements in the B variant were moving from upper and lower dive brakes to only longer upper surface dive brakes, a larger stabilizer for better low-speed handling, PVC foam sandwich core for the wing (instead of balsa) to increase durability and profile accuracy, increased gross weight and higher operating speeds.

The canopy is unique in that it has a catch that enables the front to be raised by 25mm (about 1 inch) in flight to provide a blast of ventilating air instead of the more conventional small sliding panel used for this purpose.

The connections for airbrakes and elevator are automatic. The aileron connections are manually connected with special pins.  Great care is needed to ensure the pins are pushed in and locked at the bottom as they have been known in rare cases to come loose if not installed as such.

Variants
 Glasflügel 202 (1 built)
 Glasflügel 203 (2 built)
 Glasflügel 204 (1 built)
 Glasflügel 205 Club Libelle with a high-wing, T-tail and fixed undercarriage intended for rental and club use. (171 built)

Specifications (201B)

See also

References

Thomas F, Fundamentals of Sailplane Design, College Park Press, 1999
Simons M, Segelflugzeuge 1965-2000, Eqip, 2004
Sailplane Directory

Glasflügel aircraft
1960s German sailplanes
Aircraft first flown in 1967